The 1972 Western Kentucky football team represented Western Kentucky University during the 1972 NCAA College Division football season. The team was led by head coach Jimmy Feix and finished second in the Ohio Valley Conference (OVC)after winning the conference championship the previous two years. The team roster included future National Football League (NFL) players Virgil Livers, John Bushong, Clarence "Jazz" Jackson, Brad Watson, and Mike McCoy. Andrew Francis, Jackson, McCoy, and Watson were selected to the All-OVC team.  The coaching staff included future NFL coach Romeo Crennel.

Schedule

References

Western Kentucky
Western Kentucky Hilltoppers football seasons
Western Kentucky Hilltoppers football